The Ticket "t+" is the standard single trip ticket for Paris public transit. It can be bought either as a single unit at the price of €1.90 (€2 on board a bus), or as a pack of ten, a carnet, at the price of €16.90 (increased from €14.90 since 1 November 2019), 11% cheaper compared to single tickets. However, the mentioned prices are only applied when purchasing from ticket machines of RATP. At some “authorized sellers”, prices may vary (for example, €2.50 per ticket at the bar on SNCF’s TGV trains terminating in Paris). The companies which operate Ticket "t+" are the RATP, SNCF and the Optile consortium.

The Ticket "t+" is not the only ticket used in Paris public transit: daily cards (Mobilis — or Ticket jeunes for young people on weekends), weekly and monthly cards (formerly magnetic carte orange, now (2013) chip-computerized contactless Navigo semaine/mois), and yearly cards (Navigo annuel and imagine'R for students) are also available. For tourists needing a pass for a specific length of time, the Paris Visite card is also available.

Navigo Easy card was introduced in June 2019, with the aim of replacing "t+" paper tickets by 2021. The reusable Navigo Easy card can be purchased from ticket counters for €2 but the cost of a Carnet is still €14.90 loaded onto the card. (and probably more future proof). The Navigo Easy card can also load zonal day tickets, replacing the Mobilis tickets.

General use
The Ticket "t+" can be used as a single trip ticket on:
 The complete Métro network.
 Zone 1 of the RER and Transilien networks (inside the city limits of Paris).
 The complete tramway network.
 The complete RATP bus network, in the city of Paris and its suburbs (except a few special lines as explained below).
 Most of the Optile bus network, a union of the private operators of bus lines in Paris outer suburbs.
 The Montmartre funicular.

Exceptions and details on use
On a bus and tramway, a Ticket "t+" can usually be used for any single trip, with or without a transfer, regardless of the length of the trip and for any transfers with a maximum delay of 90 minutes between the first and the last validation, providing the same bus and/or tram line is not taken twice in a row; however, a ticket used for a Metro or RER journey cannot be used for a transfer onto the bus or tram network and vice versa.   The only exceptions are Noctilien night bus lines, Orlybus and Roissybus airport bus shuttles (which do not accept the tickets and require a separate fare), and lines 299, 350 and 351, which can require up to three tickets for a journey. This only applies if the ticket is purchased in advance, as tickets purchased on board the bus do not permit any transfers. Navigo Liberté+ ticket, introduced in November 2019, allows intermodal transfers between Metro/RER zone 1 and tram/bus.

Noctilien night bus can be used with standard Ticket "t+"; however, if the trip exceeds a certain length, up to 4 tickets can be required. The system is similar on Optile bus lines, where a second ticket has to be used for any trip longer than five sections (about ).

The Orlyval metro shuttle needs a dedicated ticket which is available anywhere in the RATP network. Orlybus and Roissybus, the bus shuttles to Paris airports, also need dedicated tickets.

References

External links
RATP website — Page dedicated to the Ticket "t"

Fare collection systems in France
Paris Métro
Transport in Île-de-France